Remembering Patsy Cline & Jim Reeves is a tribute album released in 1982 remembering the music of country stars Patsy Cline and Jim Reeves who were both killed in plane crashes in the early 1960s. It was released by MCA Records. A similar album called Greatest Hits of Jim Reeves & Patsy Cline had been released the previous year by RCA Records.

Background
The album contains popular hit singles by both artists on each side of the album. However the first Jim Reeves track, I Fall to Pieces was overdubbed with Patsy Cline's version to form a duet. This was possible only because in Nashville's early 60's music scene when both hits were recorded, both Chet Atkins at RCA and Owen Bradley at Decca had access to then-brand-new 3-track mastering recorders. In this format, the orchestra was recorded on one track, the backup singers on another track, and the lead vocal on the third. This recording setup was intended for mixdown to mono in the end.

Owen Bradley had been approached by Jim Reeves' widow, Mary Reeves Davis, with the idea of creating Jim Reeves and Patsy Cline duets. With the approval of the Cline estate, as well as both RCA Records and MCA Records, work on the project began. In early 1981, Owen simply played the original 3-track tapes and recorded both Patsy's and Jim's isolated vocals onto a 24-track tape. As the two performances were recorded a semitone apart in key, subsequently, at Music City Music Hall in Nashville (the former RCA Studio A), engineers matched the keys for the two vocals, edited it all down and recorded the final onto still another 24-track tape onto which they added new orchestration, new backing tracks and remixed for stereo. RCA's similar album, Greatest Hits of Jim Reeves & Patsy Cline has the same treatment for the other song from the session.

As the original Decca label with which Cline had been under contract to, had since been merged with MCA, six Patsy Cline songs and five Jim Reeves songs are featured on that album, plus the duet. Jim Reeves had recorded exclusively for RCA Victor, so the RCA album has the reverse — six Jim Reeves hits and five Patsy Cline hits, plus a duet of Have You Ever Been Lonely?, produced during the same sessions as the duet for I Fall to Pieces.

The songs were both released as a single from the albums in question. Have You Ever Been Lonely? charted at #5 in 1982 and I Fall to Pieces charted at #54 the same year. Each was the only song overdubbed on its respective album.

The tracks recorded by Cline (including the duet) were produced by Decca/MCA's Owen Bradley, Cline's original record producer. Reeves' recordings were produced by RCA's Chet Atkins and Bob Ferguson on Side One of the album, while the recordings on Side Two were produced by Chet alone. The reverse is true for the RCA album. The album was digitally remastered and issued on CD in 1988.

In 1997 the album was certified Gold by the RIAA for a shipment of over 500,000 copies in the United States.

Track listing

Personnel
 William Paul "Willie" Ackerman — drums
 Bill Harris - engineer
 Chet Atkins — producer
 Harold Bradley — electric bass
 Owen Bradley — producer, electric bass
 David Briggs — piano
 Jerry Carrigan — drums
 John Christopher Jr. — acoustic guitar
 Patsy Cline — lead vocals
 Floyd Cramer — organ, piano, vibraphone
 Ray Edenton — rhythm guitar
 Bob Ferguson — producer
 Hank Garland — guitar
 Buddy Harman — drums
 Walter Haynes — steel guitar
 Randy Hughes — rhythm guitar
 Leo Jackson — electric guitar
 Joe Jenkins — bass, bass guitar
 James Kirkland — bass
 Mike Leech — bass
 Rufus Long — flute
 John D. Loudermilk — guitar
 Dean Manuel — piano
 Grady Martin — electric guitar
 Bob Moore — bass, acoustic bass
 Weldon Myrick — steel guitar
 Bill Pursell — organ piano
 Jim Reeves — guitar, lead vocals
 Hargus "Pig" Robbins — piano
 Mel Rogers — drums
 Velma Smith — guitar
 James Stroud — drums
 Rita Faye Wilson — autoharp
 Reggie Young — electric guitar

Background vocals
 Dolores Edgin
 Hoyt Hawkins — background vocals
 The Jordanaires — background vocals
 Anita Kerr Singers
 Anita Kerr
 Buddy Killen
 Millie Kirkham
 Hugh Jarett — background vocals
 Neal Matthews Jr.
 Louis Dean Nunley
 Gordon Stoker
 Ray C. Walker
 Duane West
 Gill Wright

Chart positions
Singles - Billboard (North America)

References

Patsy Cline albums
Jim Reeves albums
1982 compilation albums
Albums produced by Chet Atkins
Albums produced by Owen Bradley
Albums produced by Bob Ferguson (music)
MCA Records compilation albums